Gaetano Martoriello (c. 1680–1733) was an Italian painter of the late-Baroque period, active in his natal city of Naples. He painted mainly marine vedute and landscapes. He initially trained under Giacomo del Po, but desiring to paint landscapes he worked under Nicola Massaro, who claimed to have trained under Salvatore Rosa.
He is also said to have worked under Francesco Solimena, after the later painter rebuked Martoriello for criticizing some paintings by the German landscape artist, Francesco Joachim Beich.

References

External links

1733 deaths
17th-century Neapolitan people
17th-century Italian painters
Italian male painters
18th-century Italian painters
Italian landscape painters
Painters from Naples
Italian Baroque painters
Year of birth uncertain
18th-century Neapolitan people
18th-century Italian male artists